Jaldian Garrison ( – Pādegān-e Jaldīān) is a village and military installation in Lahijan-e Gharbi Rural District, Lajan District, Piranshahr County, West Azerbaijan Province, Iran. At the 2006 census, its population was 333, in 96 families.

References 

Populated places in Piranshahr County
Military installations of Iran